Mabra russoi is a moth in the family Crambidae. It is found in the Dominican Republic.

References

Moths described in 1940
Pyraustinae